Mesua stylosa is a species of flowering plant in the Calophyllaceae family. It is found only in Sri Lanka.

References

External links

stylosa
Flora of Sri Lanka
Critically endangered plants
Taxonomy articles created by Polbot